The 1918–19 Illinois Fighting Illini men's basketball team represented the University of Illinois.

Regular season
The 1918–19 season for the Illinois Fighting Illini men's basketball team, was the lowest point for head coach Ralph Jones during his tenure at the University of Illinois.  Jones experienced his only losing season as a Big Ten coach, as a matter of fact, this was the only losing season he would have in career spanning nearly 35 years.  Jones, who coached the Purdue Boilermakers men's basketball team for three seasons prior to coming to Illinois, had never lost more than 6 games during any conference campaign.  The record the Illini would possess at the conclusion of the 1918–19 season would overall be 6 wins, 8 losses with a 6 win 6 loss conference mark.  The starting lineup included captain Burt Ingwersen, Benjamin Mittleman and Ralph Fletcher at the forward positions, K.L. Wilson at center, and W.K. Kopp and P.C. Taylor as guards.

Roster

Source

Schedule
												
Source																

|-	
!colspan=12 style="background:#DF4E38; color:white;"| Non-Conference regular season
|- align="center" bgcolor=""

|-	
!colspan=9 style="background:#DF4E38; color:#FFFFFF;"|Big Ten regular season	

Bold Italic connotes conference game

Player stats

Awards and honors

References

Illinois Fighting Illini
Illinois Fighting Illini men's basketball seasons
1918 in sports in Illinois
1919 in sports in Illinois